The City of Kew was a local government area about  east of Melbourne, the state capital of Victoria, Australia, on the southeast bank of the Yarra River.

History

Kew was first incorporated as a municipal district on 19 December 1860, a borough in October 1863, and a town on 8 December 1910. It was proclaimed a city on 10 March 1921.

On 22 June 1994, the City of Kew was abolished, and along with the Cities of Camberwell and Hawthorn, was merged into the newly created City of Boroondara.

The council formerly met at the Kew Town Hall, at Cotham Road and Charles Street, Kew.

Wards

The City of Kew was divided into four wards on 27 August 1955, each electing three councillors:
 Prospect Ward
 Sackville Ward
 Studley Park Ward
 Willsmere Ward

Geography

The council area covered the suburbs of Kew and Kew East, and was bounded by the Yarra River to the north and west, Barkers Road to the south and Burke Road to the east.

Population

* Estimate in the 1958 Victorian Year Book.

References

External links
 Victorian Places - Kew

Kew
City of Boroondara
1994 disestablishments in Australia
1860 establishments in Australia